|}

The Many Clouds Chase is a Grade Two National Hunt steeplechase in Great Britain which is open to horses aged four years or older. It is run at Aintree over a distance of about 3 miles and 1 furlong (3 miles and 210 yards, or 5,020 metres), and during its running there are nineteen fences to be jumped. It is scheduled to take place each year in early December.

The race was first run as a Listed race in 2011.  It was awarded Grade Two status and renamed in honour of Many Clouds in 2017.

Winners

See also 
 Horse racing in Great Britain
 List of British National Hunt races

References 

Racing Post: 

National Hunt races in Great Britain
Aintree Racecourse
National Hunt chases